Van Waeyenberge is a surname. Notable people with the surname include:

Jozef Van Waeyenberge, Belgian businessman, brother of Piet
Piet Van Waeyenberge (born 1938), Belgian businessman

Surnames of Dutch origin